White Paradise may refer to:

 White Paradise (1924 film), a 1924 Czechoslovak film
 The White Paradise, a 1929 Austrian silent film
 White Paradise (2022 film), a 2022 French film